Monstera aureopinnata is a flowering plant in genus Monstera of family Araceae. It is an epiphyte.

Distribution 
It is native to Colombia, Ecuador, and Peru.

References 

aureopinnata
Flora of Colombia
Flora of Ecuador
Flora of Peru